Limnia paludicola is a species of fly in the family Sciomyzidae. It is found in the  Palearctic .

References

External links

Sciomyzidae
Insects described in 1965
Muscomorph flies of Europe